Villeneuve-d'Allier is a commune in the Haute-Loire department in south-central France. It was created in 1845 from part of the commune of Saint-Ilpize.

Population

See also
Communes of the Haute-Loire department

References

Communes of Haute-Loire